Carte Patrick Goodwin (born February 27, 1974) is an American attorney and politician who served as a United States senator from West Virginia in 2010. A member of the Democratic Party, he was appointed by Governor Joe Manchin on July 16, 2010, to fill the vacancy created by the death of Robert Byrd. He chose to not run in the special election on November 2, 2010, and was replaced by Manchin himself to serve the remaining two years in Byrd's term. His term expired on November 15, 2010, when Manchin was sworn in.

Before his appointment as United States Senator, he served as Manchin's chief counsel, before returning to his private practice as an attorney. In 2008, he was named one of the "Ten Most Successful Young Executives in West Virginia" by Executive magazine; and in 2010, Time named him one of the rising stars of American politics under 40, in their list of "40 under 40".

Since retiring from the Senate, Goodwin has joined the law firm Frost Brown Todd, where he serves as member-in-charge for their Charleston, West Virginia, office and vice chair for the firm's national Appellate Practice Group. From 2011 to 2021, Goodwin served as a commissioner on the United States-China Economic and Security Review Commission.

Early life and education
Goodwin was born on February 27, 1974, to Ellen (née Gibson) and Stephen Patrick Goodwin, and was raised in rural Mount Alto, West Virginia. Goodwin graduated from Ripley High School in 1992, and graduated magna cum laude from Marietta College in 1996 where he earned a Bachelor of Arts in philosophy. In 1999 Goodwin earned his Juris Doctor from Emory University Law School, graduating a member of the Order of the Coif.

Career 
After graduating from law school, Goodwin clerked for the 4th Circuit Judge Robert King from 1999 to 2000. In 2000 Goodwin joined his family's law firm, Goodwin & Goodwin, working there until 2005. Goodwin rejoined the firm in 2009. Goodwin is an attorney at Frost Brown Todd.
In 2004 Goodwin worked on then-Secretary of State Joe Manchin's successful campaign for governor. Goodwin was appointed Chairman of the West Virginia School Building Authority by Manchin, and later served as his chief counsel from 2005 to 2009.

As the Governor's counsel, Goodwin assisted in the drafting of mine rescue and security measures, sparked by fatal accidents in the Aracoma and Sago Mines. In June 2009, Manchin appointed Goodwin Chairman of the Independent Commission on Judicial Reform, which studied the need for changes in the judicial system in West Virginia. Also serving in the commission, as honorary chairwoman, was former Supreme Court Associate Justice Sandra Day O'Connor.

In 2011, Senate Majority Leader Harry Reid appointed Goodwin to a two-year term as a commissioner of the United States-China Economic and Security Review Commission, a position he was reappointed to until 2021. Goodwin is often speculated as a candidate for statewide office in West Virginia.

U.S. Senate

On July 16, 2010, Manchin appointed Goodwin to the U.S. Senate seat vacated by the death of Senator Robert Byrd, until a special election could choose a permanent successor. At his appointment to Byrd's seat, Manchin stated they had "passed this torch to another generation," with Goodwin becoming the youngest senator, and Byrd previously being the oldest one. Goodwin stated that he would not seek election to the seat in his own right, and that he would leave office once a new senator had been elected. Observers suggested that Goodwin had been appointed as a placeholder for Manchin, who subsequently won the special election to complete Byrd's term.

Before being sworn into office, Goodwin broke with Senate Democrats, stating he would not support their cap-and-trade bill. Goodwin was sworn into the Senate on July 20, 2010, and quickly joined with fellow Democrats to pass an extension of unemployment benefits, an effort they previously were unable to pass due to Republican filibuster. Goodwin voted to confirm Elena Kagan as an associate justice of the Supreme Court of the United States.

His term expired on November 15, 2010, when Manchin was sworn in. During his short tenure, Goodwin served on the following committees:
Committee on Armed Services
Subcommittee on Emerging Threats and Capabilities
Subcommittee on Readiness and Management Support
Subcommittee on Strategic Forces
Committee on the Budget
Health, Education, Labor, and Pensions
Subcommittee on Employment and Workplace Safety
Subcommittee on Primary Health and Aging
Committee on Rules and Administration

In August 2021, judge Robert Bruce King announced plans to assume senior status upon the confirmation of a successor. However, in November, he formally withdrew his August letter and announced he would continue on as an active member of the Fourth Circuit. Reports surfaced that King preferred Goodwin to be nominated to replace him while the White House preferred J. Jeaneen Legato, a personal-injury lawyer in Charleston, West Virginia.

Personal life
Goodwin's wife Rochelle worked for West Virginia's U.S. Senator Jay Rockefeller, as his state director. Together they have two children, a son, Wesley and a daughter, Anna.

Goodwin was mentioned as a possible candidate to run to succeed Senator Jay Rockefeller, who chose not to run for re-election in 2014. However, in an interview with WV MetroNews Goodwin said he had no intention of running, citing family concerns.

Goodwin comes from a prominent West Virginia political family. His late father chaired the West Virginia University board of directors. His uncle, Joseph Robert Goodwin, served as Chief Judge of the United States District Court for the Southern District of West Virginia. His cousin, Booth Goodwin, was appointed United States Attorney for the Southern District of West Virginia by President Barack Obama. Booth Goodwin's wife, Amy Shuler Goodwin, is the mayor of Charleston, West Virginia and, prior to her election, served as a spokesperson for West Virginia Governors Bob Wise and Earl Ray Tomblin.

References

External links
 

 

1974 births
Methodists from West Virginia
Democratic Party United States senators from West Virginia
Emory University School of Law alumni
Goodwin family
Living people
Marietta College alumni
Politicians from Charleston, West Virginia
People from Jackson County, West Virginia
West Virginia Democrats
West Virginia lawyers
21st-century American politicians
Lawyers from Charleston, West Virginia
21st-century American lawyers